Darker Image was an American comic book published by Image Comics. The series was intended as 4-issue miniseries, serving as an introduction to three "grim and gritty" characters. The series, however, only had one published issue, published in March 1993.

A gold logo incentive variant as well as the ‘platinum’ (black and white with silver foil logo) version of this issue exists. Each issue when new was polybagged with one of three trading cards, The Maxx, Bloodwulf and Deathblow. 

In 18th October 2021, a group of fans created a fanzine called Darkest Image, a 200-page anthology series that feature several characters from the Image universe of the 1990s. All profits from the sale are donated to the Comic Book Legal Defense Fund.

Contents 
Issue #1 features these three stories:
 The Maxx (8 pp.) by Sam Kieth and William Messner-Loebs
 Bloodwulf (9 pp.) by Rob Liefeld
 Deathblow (9 pp.) by Jim Lee and Brandon Choi

External links
Darker Image @ comicbookdb

Image Comics titles
Comics by Jim Lee
WildStorm titles
Extreme Studios titles
1993 comics debuts